The Civil War batteries of Helena, Arkansas are a series of four defensive earthworks erected in Helena, Arkansas by Union Army forces during the American Civil War.  The four batteries played a significant role in the Battle of Helena, fought on July 4, 1863, which secured the Arkansas side of the Mississippi River for the Union.  They are listed individually on the National Register of Historic Places.

Historical background

Helena, Arkansas is strategically located at the southern end of Crowley's Ridge, a land formation providing significant views over the Mississippi River.  It was occupied by Union Army forces in 1862, and was used by them as a staging point for supporting troops in the Siege of Vicksburg, MS, which began in May 1863.  These forces constructed a ring of defenses around the city to guard the major land approaches, and control the high ground overlooking Fort Curtis its major base just west of the city.  The Union Navy controlled the Mississippi, with the USS Tyler stationed nearby.  The defenses built by the forces commanded by General Benjamin Prentiss at Helena included artillery batteries, rifle pits, and abatis.

Confederate leaders in Arkansas planned an offensive in June 1863 to retake Helena and cut the Union supply line, relieving the pressure on besieged Vicksburg.  Under the overall command of General Theophilus H. Holmes, Confederate forces launched an attack on Helena on July 4, 1863, the same day that Vicksburg was surrendered to Union forces.  Prentiss ordered the construction of these four batteries in response to increased Confederate activity in the surrounding area in late June.  The coordination of the separate elements of the Confederate attack were frustrated by felled trees laid across the approach roads by the defenders, and were eventually subjected to fire from all four batteries, as well as from the supporting Navy ships.  Although the Confederates successfully took Battery C, fire from the other three drove them back.  An assault on Battery D reached its rifle pits, but got no further.  The Confederates suffered more than 1,600 casualties, to 239 for Union forces.

Battery A
This battery overlooked the Old St. Francis Road and the Sterling Road. It was manned by the 33rd Missouri and the 29th Iowa, who easily repulsed forces led by General John S. Marmaduke that were trying to take it.

Battery B
This battery was never itself endangered, and fired on Confederate forces attempting to reach Batteries A and C.

Battery C
Battery C was located on what is locally called Graveyard Hill, south of Clark and west of York Street, and is now a city park. The hill exhibits few surviving remnants of the intense fighting that took place here, because a significant portion of its eastern slope was removed in the 1930s for the construction of levees, and erosion has claimed most of the evidence on the hilltop of the earthworks and rifle pits. Battery C was manned by members of the 33rd Missouri, and provided supporting fire for the other positions in the early stages of the battle, until the Confederates began a direct assault on it. This area was the subject of intense fighting, and bombardment from the other three batteries and the gunboats. Confederate attempts to carry the assault to Fort Curtis and Battery D were turned back, and they withdrew from the battery before they had a chance to bring up their own artillery.

Battery D
Battery D stands on Hindman Hill, off Military Road southwest of downtown Helena, and overlooked the main road between Helena and Little Rock. Of the four batteries, it is the one that is the best preserved, with its earthworks and rifle pits still evident near the crest of the hill.  The battery was manned by Union forces from Iowa, Missouri, and Indiana, and was the target of a Confederate assault launched at daybreak by Arkansas forces commanded by Brigadier General James F. Fagan.  They successfully penetrated three levels of rifle pits despite withering fire from batteries C and D.  Reinforcements sent to support the assault from Battery C were repulsed, and Fagan was ordered to withdraw.  His orders did not reach all of his men, however, and a pocket of Confederates was surrounded and captured as a result.

See also
Arkansas in the American Civil War
National Register of Historic Places listings in Phillips County, Arkansas

References

Military facilities on the National Register of Historic Places in Arkansas
Military installations established in 1863
Buildings and structures in Phillips County, Arkansas
Battlefields of the Western Theater of the American Civil War
National Register of Historic Places in Phillips County, Arkansas
American Civil War on the National Register of Historic Places